The 1928 Middle Tennessee State Teachers football team represented the Middle Tennessee State Teachers College (now known as Middle Tennessee State University) during the 1928 college football season. Led by third-year head coach Frank Faulkinberry, Middle Tennessee State Teachers compiled a record of 2–4–1. The team captain was Hubert Swann.

Schedule

References

Middle Tennessee State Teachers
Middle Tennessee Blue Raiders football seasons
Middle Tennessee State Teachers football